Mouth to mouth may refer to:

 Mouth-to-mouth resuscitation, a part of cardiopulmonary resuscitation

Film 
 Mouth to Mouth (1978 film), an Australian film by John Duigan
 Mouth to Mouth (1995 film), a Spanish film by Manuel Gómez Pereira
 Mouth to Mouth (2005 British film), a drama by Alison Murray
 Mouth to Mouth (2005 Swedish film), a drama by Björn Runge

Music 
 Mouth to Mouth (The Blackeyed Susans album), 1995
 Mouth to Mouth (Levellers album), 1997
 Mouth to Mouth (Lipps Inc. album), 1979
 Mouth to Mouth (Mental As Anything album), a 1987 album by Mental As Anything
 Mouth to Mouth, a 1992 EP by Genkaku Allergy
 "Mouth to Mouth", a song by Faith No More from Album of the Year
 "Mouth to Mouth", a song by The Vaselines from Sex with an X

Television 
 Mouth to Mouth (TV series), a 2009 British comedy-drama series